Archie Williams was an athlete.

Archie Williams may also refer to:

Archie Williams (footballer) (1927–1985), Scottish football player, who played for Hearts, Motherwell and Dunfermline
Archie Williams (footballer born 1898) from List of Wigan Borough F.C. players
Archie Williams (singer) (born c. 1960), Contestant in 2020 in America's Got Talent season 15

See also
Archibald Williams (disambiguation)